St. Sebastian's College is a school in Kandana, Sri Lanka. It is located in the Ja-Ela Education Division of the Negombo Zone in the Gampaha District. Currently its Principal is Rev. Fr. Sudath Hemantha Fernando.

External links 
Sebastianite Official Website
 Sinhala Wikipedia page
 Google+ page
 Youtube Channel

See also 
 List of schools in Sri Lanka

1979 establishments in Sri Lanka
Educational institutions established in 1979
Provincial schools in Sri Lanka
Schools in Gampaha District